
Jinfeng may refer to these places:

Taiwan
Jinfeng, Taitung (金峰鄉), a township in Taitung County

China

Districts
Jinfeng District (金凤区), in Yinchuan, Ningxia

Towns
Jinfeng, Jiulongpo District (金凤), in Jiulongpo District, Chongqing
Jinfeng, Kaizhou District (金峰), in Kaizhou District, Chongqing
Jinfeng, Fujian (金峰), in Fuzhou, Fujian
Jinfeng, Jiangsu (锦丰), in Zhangjiagang, Jiangsu
Jinfeng, Mianyang (金峰), in Mianyang, Sichuan
Jinfeng, Nanchong (金凤), in Nanchong, Sichuan

Townships
Jinfeng Township, Hunan (金凤乡), in Xinhua County, Hunan
Jinfeng Township, Sichuan (金峰乡), in Jingyan County, Sichuan
Jinfeng Township, Zhejiang (金峰乡), in Chun'an County, Zhejiang

See also
Jinfeng Gold Mine, a gold mine in Guizhou, China